The 1984 NCAA Division I Wrestling Championships were the 54th NCAA Division I Wrestling Championships to be held. Princeton University in East Rutherford, New Jersey hosted the tournament at Brendan Byrne Arena.

Iowa took home the team championship with  123.75 points and having one individual champion.

Jim Zalesky of Iowa was named the Most Outstanding Wrestler and Tab Thacker of North Carolina State received the Gorriaran Award.

Team results

Individual finals

References

NCAA Division I Wrestling Championship
NCAA
Wrestling competitions in the United States
NCAA Division I  Wrestling Championships
NCAA Division I  Wrestling Championships
NCAA Division I  Wrestling Championships